Kiszczonka is a traditional soup common in Poznań, known also in some other regions of Poland. It consists of water with cooked black pudding, flour, milk and spices. The soup has about 760 kcal.

References

Polish soups